Charles Robert Redford Jr. (born August 18, 1936) is an American actor and filmmaker. He is the  recipient of various accolades, including an Academy Award from four nominations, a British Academy Film Award, two Golden Globe Awards, the Cecil B. DeMille Award and the Presidential Medal of Freedom. In 2014, Time named him one of the 100 most influential people in the world.

Appearing on stage in the late 1950s, Redford's television career began in 1960, including an appearance on The Twilight Zone in 1962. He earned an Emmy nomination as Best Supporting Actor for his performance in The Voice of Charlie Pont (1962). His greatest Broadway success was as the stuffy newlywed husband of co-star Elizabeth Ashley's character in Neil Simon's Barefoot in the Park (1963). Redford made his film debut in War Hunt (1962). He starred with Natalie Wood in Inside Daisy Clover (1965) which won him a Golden Globe for the best new star. He starred alongside Paul Newman in Butch Cassidy and the Sundance Kid (1969), which was a huge success and made him a major star. He had a critical and box office hit with Jeremiah Johnson (1972), and in 1973 he had the greatest hit of his career, the blockbuster crime caper The Sting, a reunion with Paul Newman, for which he was nominated for an Academy Award; that same year, he also starred opposite Barbra Streisand in The Way We Were. The popular and acclaimed All the President's Men (1976) was a landmark film for Redford.

In the 1980s, Redford began his career as a director with Ordinary People (1980), which was one of the most critically and publicly acclaimed films of the decade, winning four Academy Awards including Best Picture and the Academy Award for Best Director for Redford. He continued acting and starred in Brubaker (1980), as well as playing the male lead in Out of Africa (1985), which was an enormous box office success and won seven Oscars including Best Picture. He released his third film as a director, A River Runs Through It, in 1992. He went on to receive Best Director and Best Picture nominations in 1995 for Quiz Show. He received a second Academy Award—for Lifetime Achievement—in 2002. In 2010, he was made a chevalier of the Légion d'Honneur. Redford is also one of the founders of the Sundance Film Festival.

Early life 
Redford was born on August 18, 1936, in Santa Monica, California, to Martha Woodruff Redford (née Hart; 1914–1955) and Charles Robert Redford (1914–1991), an accountant. He has a half brother, William, from his father's first marriage. Redford is of English, Scottish, and Irish ancestry. His patrilineal great-great-grandfather, a Protestant Englishman named Elisha Redford, married Mary Ann McCreery, of Irish Catholic descent, in Manchester. They emigrated to New York City in 1849, immediately settling in Stonington, Connecticut. They had a son named Charles, the first in line to have been given the name. Regarding Redford's maternal lineage, the Harts were Irish from Galway and the Greens were Scots-Irish who settled in the United States in the 18th century.

Redford's family moved to Van Nuys, Los Angeles, while his father worked in El Segundo. Robert attended Van Nuys High School, where he was classmates with baseball pitcher Don Drysdale. He has described himself as having been a "bad" student, finding inspiration outside the classroom, and being interested in art and sports. He hit tennis balls with Pancho Gonzales at the Los Angeles Tennis Club to warm him up.

After graduating from high school in 1954, he attended the University of Colorado in Boulder for a year and a half, where he was a member of the Kappa Sigma fraternity. While there, he worked at a restaurant/bar called The Sink, where a painting of his likeness still figures prominently among the bar's murals. While at Colorado, Redford began drinking heavily and, as a result, lost his half-scholarship and was kicked out of school. He went on to travel in Europe, living in France, Spain, and Italy. He later studied painting at the Pratt Institute in Brooklyn and took classes at the American Academy of Dramatic Arts (Class of 1959) in New York City.

Career

Theater 
Redford's career, like that of many major stars who emerged in the 1950s, began in New York City, where the actor found work both on stage and in television. His Broadway debut was in a small role in Tall Story (1959), followed by parts in The Highest Tree (1959) and Sunday in New York (1961). His biggest Broadway success was as the stuffy newlywed husband of Elizabeth Ashley in the original 1963 cast of Neil Simon's Barefoot in the Park.

Television 
Starting in 1960, Redford appeared as a guest star on numerous television drama programs, including Naked City, Maverick, The Untouchables, The Americans, Whispering Smith, Perry Mason, Alfred Hitchcock Presents, Route 66, Dr. Kildare, Playhouse 90, Tate, The Twilight Zone, The Virginian, and Captain Brassbound's Conversion, among others.

In 1960, Redford was cast as Danny Tilford, a mentally disturbed young man trapped in the wreckage of his family garage, in "Breakdown", one of the last episodes of the syndicated adventure series, Rescue 8, starring Jim Davis and Lang Jeffries.

Redford earned an Emmy nomination as Best Supporting Actor for his performance in The Voice of Charlie Pont (ABC, 1962). One of his last television appearances until 2019 was on October 7, 1963, on Breaking Point, an ABC medical drama about psychiatry.

Film

Redford made his screen debut in Tall Story (1960) in a minor role. The film's stars were Anthony Perkins, Jane Fonda (her debut), and Ray Walston. After his Broadway success, he was cast in larger feature roles in movies. In 1962 Redford got his second film role in War Hunt, and was soon after casting alongside screen legend Alec Guinness in the war comedy Situation Hopeless ... But Not Serious, in which he played an American soldier falsely imprisoned by a German civilian even after the war has ended. In Inside Daisy Clover (1965), which won him a Golden Globe for best new star, he played a bisexual movie star who marries starlet Natalie Wood, and rejoined her along with Charles Bronson for Sydney Pollack's This Property Is Condemned (1966) — again, as her lover, though this time in a film which achieved even greater success. The same year saw his first teaming (on equal footing) with Jane Fonda, in Arthur Penn's The Chase. This film marked the only time Redford would star with Marlon Brando. Fonda and Redford were paired again in the popular big-screen version of Barefoot in the Park (1967) and were again co-stars many years later in Pollack's The Electric Horseman (1979), followed 38 years later with a Netflix feature, Our Souls at Night.

After this initial success, Redford became concerned about his blond male stereotype image and turned down roles in Who's Afraid of Virginia Woolf? and The Graduate. Redford found the niche he was looking for in George Roy Hill's Butch Cassidy and the Sundance Kid (1969), scripted by William Goldman, in which he was paired for the first time with Paul Newman. The film was a huge success and made him a major bankable star, cementing his screen image as an intelligent, reliable, sometimes sardonic good guy. While Redford did not receive an Academy Award or Golden Globe nomination for playing the Sundance Kid, he won a British Academy of Film and Television Award (BAFTA) for that role and his parts in Downhill Racer (1969) and Tell Them Willie Boy Is Here (1969). The latter two films and the subsequent Little Fauss and Big Halsy (1970), and The Hot Rock (1972) were not commercially successful. The political satire The Candidate (1972) was a moderate box office and critical success.

Starting in 1973, Redford experienced an almost-unparalleled four-year run of box office success. The western Jeremiah Johnsons (1972) box office earnings from early 1973 until its second re-release in 1975 would have placed it as the No. 2 highest-grossing film of 1973. The romantic period drama with Barbra Streisand, The Way We Were (1973), was the 11th highest-grossing film of 1973. The crime caper reunion with Paul Newman, The Sting (1973), became the top-grossing film of 1974 and one of the top 20 highest-grossing movies of all time when adjusted for inflation, plus landed Redford the lone nomination of his career for the Academy Award for Best Actor. The romantic drama The Great Gatsby (1974) was the No. 8 highest-grossing film of 1974. Butch Cassidy and the Sundance Kid (1969) placed as the No. 10 highest-grossing film for 1974 as it was re-released due to the popularity of The Sting. In 1974 Redford became the first performer since Bing Crosby in 1946 to have three films in a year's top ten grossing titles. Each year between 1974 and 1976, movie exhibitors voted Redford Hollywood's top box-office star. 

In 1975, Redford's hit movies included 1920s aviation drama, The Great Waldo Pepper (1975), and the spy thriller Three Days of the Condor (1975), alongside Faye Dunaway, which finished at Nos. 16 and 17 in box office grosses for 1975, respectively. In 1976 he co-starred with Dustin Hoffman in the No. 2 highest-grossing film for the year, the critically acclaimed All the President's Men. In 1975, 1977 and 1978, Redford won the Golden Globe for Favorite World Film Star, a popularity-based award that is no longer awarded.

All the President's Men (1976), in which Redford and Hoffman play Washington Post reporters Bob Woodward and Carl Bernstein, was a landmark film for Redford. Not only was he the executive producer and co-star, but the film's serious subject matter — the Watergate scandal — and its attempt to create a realistic portrayal of journalism also reflected the actor's offscreen concerns for political causes. The film landed eight Academy Award nominations, including for Best Picture and Best Director (Alan J. Pakula), while winning for the Best Screenplay (Goldman).  It actually won the New York Film Critics Award for Best Picture and Best Director.

In 1977, Redford appeared in a segment of the war film A Bridge Too Far (1977). Then he took a two-year hiatus from movies, before starring as past-his-prime rodeo star in the adventure-romance The Electric Horseman (1979).  This film reunited him with Jane Fonda, finishing at No. 9 in the box office for 1980. Later that year he appeared in the prison drama Brubaker (1980), playing a prison warden attempting to reform the system. His directorial debut, Ordinary People, which followed the disintegration of an upper-class American family after the death of a son, was one of the most critically and publicly acclaimed films of the decade, winning four Oscars, including Best Director for Redford himself, and Best Picture.

Soon after that, he starred in the baseball drama The Natural (1984). Sydney Pollack's Out of Africa (1985), with Redford in the male lead role opposite Meryl Streep, became a large box office success (combined 1985 and 1986 grosses placed it at No. 5 for 1986), won a Golden Globe for Best Picture, and won seven Oscars, including Best Picture. Streep was nominated for Best Actress but Redford did not receive a nomination. The movie proved to be Redford's biggest success of the decade and Redford and Pollack's most successful of their seven movies together.

Redford's next film, Legal Eagles (1986) alongside Debra Winger, was only a minor success at the box office. After that, his second directorial project, The Milagro Beanfield War (1987), failed to generate the same level of attention as Ordinary People.

Redford continued as a major star throughout the 1990s and 2000s. He released his third film as a director, A River Runs Through It, in 1992, which was a return to mainstream success for Redford as a director and brought a young Brad Pitt to greater prominence. In 1993, he played what became one of his most popular and recognized roles, starring in Indecent Proposal as a millionaire businessman who tests a couple's morals; the film became one of the year's biggest hits. He co-starred with Michelle Pfeiffer in the newsroom romance Up Close & Personal (1996), and with Kristin Scott Thomas and a young Scarlett Johansson in The Horse Whisperer (1998), which he also directed. Redford also continued work in films with political contexts, such as Havana (1990), playing Jack Weil, a professional gambler in 1959 Cuba during the Revolution, as well as Sneakers (1992), in which he co-starred with River Phoenix and Sidney Poitier, his first teaming with the latter.

He appeared as a disgraced Army general sent to prison in the prison drama The Last Castle (2001), directed by Rod Lurie. In the same year, Redford reteamed with Brad Pitt for Spy Game, another success for the pair but with Redford switching this time from director to actor. During that time, he planned to direct and star in a sequel of The Candidate but the project never happened. Redford, a leading environmental activist, narrated the IMAX documentary Sacred Planet (2004), a sweeping journey across the globe to some of its most exotic and endangered places. In The Clearing (2004), a thriller co-starring Helen Mirren, Redford was a successful businessman whose kidnapping unearths the secrets and inadequacies that led to his achieving the American Dream.

Redford stepped back into producing with The Motorcycle Diaries (2004), a coming-of-age road film about a young medical student, Ernesto "Che" Guevara, and his friend Alberto Granado. It also explored the political and social issues of South America that influenced Guevara and shaped his future.  With five years spent on the film's making, Redford was credited by director Walter Salles for being instrumental in getting it made and released.

Back in front of the camera, Redford received good notices for his role in director Lasse Hallström's An Unfinished Life (2005) as a cantankerous rancher who is forced to take in his estranged daughter-in-law (Jennifer Lopez)—whom he blames for his son's death—and the granddaughter he never knew he had when they fled an abusive relationship.  The film, which sat on the shelf for many months while its distributor Miramax was restructured, was generally dismissed as clichéd and overly sentimental. Meanwhile, Redford returned to familiar territory when he reteamed with Meryl Streep 22 years after they starred in Out of Africa, for his personal project Lions for Lambs (2007), which also starred Tom Cruise. After a great deal of hype, the film opened to mixed reviews and disappointing box office.

Redford appeared in the 2011 documentary Buck by Cindy Meehl, where he discussed his experiences with title subject Buck Brannaman during the production of The Horse Whisperer. In 2012, Redford directed The Company You Keep, in which he starred as a former Weather Underground activist who goes on the run after a journalist discovers his identity. In 2013, he starred in All Is Lost, directed by J.C. Chandor, about a man lost at sea. He received acclaim for his performance in the film, in which he is its only cast member and there is almost no dialogue. Redford was nominated for a Golden Globe, his first Best Actor nomination for a Golden Globe, and won the New York Film Critics Circle Award for Best Actor, his first time winning an acting honour from that group (he had been nominated in 1969 for Downhill Racer).

In April 2014, Redford played the main antagonist of the Marvel Studios superhero film Captain America: The Winter Soldier, Alexander Pierce, the head of S.H.I.E.L.D. and leader of the Hydra cell operating the Triskelion. Redford was a co-producer and, with Emma Thompson and Nick Nolte, costar of the 2015 Broad Green Pictures film A Walk in the Woods, based on Bill Bryson's book of the same name. Redford had optioned the film rights for the book from Bryson after reading it more than a decade earlier, with the intent of costarring in it with Paul Newman, but had shelved the project after Newman's death. The same year, he played news anchor Dan Rather in James Vanderbilt's Truth alongside Cate Blanchett. In 2016, he took the supporting role of Mr. Meacham in the Disney remake  Pete's Dragon.

Redford starred in The Discovery and Our Souls at Night, both released on Netflix streaming in 2017. The latter film, which was also produced by Redford, reunited him with co-star Jane Fonda for the fourth time and garnered positive reviews. Redford played bank robber Forrest Tucker in the drama film The Old Man & the Gun, which was released in September 2018, and for which he received a Golden Globe nomination. 

In August 2018, Redford announced his retirement from acting after completion of the film, though the following month, Redford stated that he "regretted" announcing his retirement because "you never know". He briefly reprised his role as Alexander Pierce for a cameo appearance in Avengers: Endgame, filmed in 2017 prior to the completion of the former film.

Author
In 1976, Robert Redford published The Outlaw Trail: A Journey Through Time.  Redford states, "The Outlaw Trail. It was a name that fascinated me - a geographical anchor in Western folklore. Whether real or imagined, it was a name that, for me, held a kind of magic, a freedom, a mystery. I wanted to see it in much the same way as the outlaws did, by horse and by foot, and document the adventure with text and photographs."

Filmography

Director 

Redford had long harbored ambitions to work on both sides of the camera.  As early as 1969, Redford had served as the executive producer for Downhill Racer. His first film as director was 1980's Best Picture winner Ordinary People, a drama about the slow disintegration of an upper-middle class family, for which he won the Academy Award for Best Director. Redford was credited with obtaining a powerful dramatic performance from Mary Tyler Moore, as well as superb work from Donald Sutherland and Timothy Hutton, who also won the Oscar for Best Supporting Actor.

Redford did not direct again until The Milagro Beanfield War (1988), a well-crafted, though not commercially successful, screen version of John Nichols's acclaimed novel of the Southwest. The Milagro Beanfield War is the story of the people of Milagro, New Mexico (based on the real town of Truchas in northern New Mexico), overcoming big developers who set about to ruin their community and force them out with tax increases.  Other directorial projects have included the period drama A River Runs Through It (1992), based on Norman Maclean's novella, and the exposé Quiz Show (1994), about the quiz show scandal of the late 1950s. In the latter film, Redford worked from a screenplay by Paul Attanasio with noted cinematographer Michael Ballhaus and a strong cast that featured Paul Scofield, John Turturro, Rob Morrow, and Ralph Fiennes. Redford also directed Matt Damon and Will Smith in The Legend of Bagger Vance (2000). In 2010, Redford released The Conspirator, a period drama revolving around the assassination of Abraham Lincoln. In 2012, he directed the political thriller  The Company You Keep starring himself, Shia LaBeouf and Julie Christie.

Awards 

Redford attended the University of Colorado in the 1950s and received an honorary degree in 1988.

In 1989, the National Audubon Society awarded Redford its highest honor, the Audubon Medal.

In 1995, he received an honorary Doctor of Humane Letters degree from Bard College. He was a 2002 Lifetime Achievement Award/Honorary Oscar recipient at the 74th Academy Awards.

In 1996, he was awarded the National Medal of Arts.

In December 2005, he received the Kennedy Center Honors for his contributions to American culture. The honors recipients are recognized for their lifetime contributions to American culture through the performing arts: whether in dance, music, theater, opera, motion pictures or television.

In 2008, he was awarded The Dorothy and Lillian Gish Prize, one of the richest prizes in the arts, given annually to "a man or woman who has made an outstanding contribution to the beauty of the world and to mankind's enjoyment and understanding of life."

The University of Southern California (USC) School of Dramatic Arts announced the first annual Robert Redford Award for Engaged Artists in 2009.  According to the school's website, the award was created "to honor those who have distinguished themselves not only in the exemplary quality, skill and innovation of their work, but also in their public commitment to social responsibility, to increasing awareness of global issues and events, and to inspiring and empowering young people."

Redford received an honorary Doctor of Fine Arts from Brown University at the 240th Commencement exercises on May 25, 2008, with the actor also speaking at the ceremonies. On October 14, 2010, Redford was appointed chevalier of the Légion d'honneur by President Nicolas Sarkozy. He was a 2010 recipient of the New Mexico Governor's Award for Excellence in the Arts.

On May 24, 2015, Redford delivered the commencement address and received an honorary degree from Colby College in Waterville, Maine. On November 22, 2016, President Barack Obama honored Redford with a Presidential Medal of Freedom.

In 2017, Golden Lion for Lifetime Achievement at the 74th Venice Film Festival.

On February 22, 2019, Redford received the Honorary César at the 44th César Awards in Paris.

Sundance Institute
With the financial proceeds of his acting success, starting with his salaries from Butch Cassidy and the Sundance Kid  and Downhill Racer, Redford bought a ski area on the east side of Mount Timpanogos northeast of Provo, Utah, called "Timp Haven". He renamed it "Sundance" after his Sundance Kid character. Redford's wife Lola was from Utah and they had built a home in the area in 1963. Portions of the movie Jeremiah Johnson (1972), a film which is both one of Redford's favorites and one that has heavily influenced him, was shot near the ski area.

Redford went on to found the Sundance Film Festival, which became the country's largest festival for independent films. In 2008, Sundance exhibited 125 feature-length films from 34 countries, with more than 50,000 attendees, Salt Lake City, and Park City, Utah.

Robert Redford also founded the Sundance Institute; Sundance Cinemas; Sundance Catalog; and the Sundance Channel; all in and around Park City, 30 miles (48 km) north of the Sundance ski area. Redford also owned a Park City restaurant, Zoom, that closed in May 2017.

Wildwood Enterprises, Inc.
Robert Redford is the co-owner of Wildwood Enterprises, Inc., with Bill Holderman, producer, with the following film credits: Lions for Lambs; Quiz Show; A River Runs Through It; Ordinary People; The Horse Whisperer; The Legend of Bagger Vance; Slums of Beverly Hills; The Motorcycle Diaries; and The Conspirator.

Sundance Productions
Redford is the president and co-founder of Sundance Productions, with Laura Michalchyshyn.

Most recently, Sundance Productions produced Chicagoland (CNN), Cathedrals of Culture (Berlin Film Festival), The March (PBS) and Emmy nominee All The President's Men Revisited (Discovery), Isabella Rossellini's Green Porno Live!, and To Russia With Love on Epix.

Independent films 
Since founding the nonprofit Sundance Institute in Park City, Utah, in 1981, Redford has been deeply involved with independent film. 

Through its various workshop programs and popular film festival, Sundance has provided much-needed support for independent filmmakers. In 1995, Redford signed a deal with Showtime to start a 24-hour cable television channel devoted to airing independent films. The Sundance Channel premiered on February 29, 1996.

Personal life 
On August 9, 1958, in Las Vegas, Nevada, Redford married Lola Van Wagenen, who dropped out of college to marry him. A Mormon ceremony took place on September 12 at Lola's grandmother's home. They had four children: Scott Anthony Redford (September 1, 1959 – November 17, 1959), Shauna Jean Redford (born November 15, 1960), David James Redford (May 5, 1962 – October 16, 2020), and Amy Hart Redford (born October 22, 1970). They divorced in 1985.

Scott Redford died of sudden infant death syndrome at the age of  months and is buried at Provo City Cemetery in Provo, Utah. Shauna Redford is a painter and married to journalist Eric Schlosser. James Redford was a writer and producer, while Amy Redford is an actress, director, and producer. Redford has seven grandchildren.

In July 2009, Redford married his longtime partner, Sibylle Szaggars, at the Louis C. Jacob Hotel in Hamburg, Germany. She had moved in with Redford in the 1990s and shared his home in Sundance, Utah.

In May 2011, Alfred A. Knopf published Robert Redford: The Biography by Michael Feeney Callan, written over fifteen years with Redford's input and drawn from his personal papers and diaries.

Political activism 

Redford supports environmentalism, Native American rights, LGBT rights, and the arts.  He has also supported advocacy groups, such as the Political Action Committee of the Directors Guild of America. Redford has supported Republicans, including Brent Cornell Morris in his unsuccessful campaign for the Republican nomination for Utah's 3rd congressional district in 1990. Redford also supported Gary Herbert, another Republican and a friend, in Herbert's successful 2004 campaign to be elected Utah's Lieutenant Governor. Herbert later became Governor of Utah.

As an avid environmentalist, Redford is a trustee of the Natural Resources Defense Council. He endorsed Democratic President Barack Obama for re-election in 2012. Redford is the first quote on the back cover of Donald Trump's book Crippled America (2015), saying of Trump's candidacy, "I'm glad he's in there, being the way he is, and saying what he says and the ways he says it, I think shakes things up and I think that is very needed." A representative later clarified that Redford's statement, taken from a longer conversation with Larry King, was not intended to endorse Trump for president. In 2019, Redford penned an op-ed in which he referred to Trump's administration as a "monarchy in disguise" and stated "[i]t's time for Trump to go." Redford later co-authored another op-ed in which he criticized Trump's handling of the coronavirus pandemic while also citing the collective public response to the pandemic as a model for how to respond to climate change. He has criticized the decision to withdraw from the Paris Agreement. In July 2020, Redford penned an op-ed in which he stated President Trump lacks a "moral compass." In the same piece, he announced that he would be voting for Joe Biden in the 2020 presidential election.

Redford is opposed to the TransCanada Corporation's Keystone Pipeline. In 2013, he was identified by its CEO, Russ Girling, for leading the anti-pipeline protest movement.

In April 2014, Redford, a Pitzer College Trustee, and Pitzer College President Laura Skandera Trombley announced that the college will divest fossil fuel stocks from its endowment; at the time, it was the higher education institution with the largest endowment in the US to make this commitment. The press conference was held at the LA Press Club. In November 2012, Pitzer launched the Robert Redford Conservancy for Southern California Sustainability at Pitzer College. The Redford Conservancy educates the next generation of students to create solutions for the most challenging and urgent sustainability problems.

References

Further reading

External links

 
 Robert Redford on IBDB (Internet Broadway Database)
 Sundance Founder Robert Redford on His Life, His Activism and the Importance of Independent Films – Democracy Now, January 2010
 Robert Redford appearances on C-SPAN
 Portrait of Robert Redford advocating against the demolition of Santa Monica Pier while filming "The Sting", Los Angeles, California, 1973. Los Angeles Times Photographic Archive (Collection 1429). UCLA Library Special Collections, Charles E. Young Research Library, University of California, Los Angeles.

1936 births
20th-century American male actors
20th Century Studios contract players
21st-century American male actors
Academy Honorary Award recipients
Activists from California
American Academy of Dramatic Arts alumni
American environmentalists
American film producers
American male film actors
American male television actors
American people of English descent
American people of Irish descent
American people of Scottish descent
American philanthropists
Best Actor BAFTA Award winners
Best Directing Academy Award winners
Best Director Golden Globe winners
California Democrats
Cecil B. DeMille Award Golden Globe winners
César Honorary Award recipients
Chevaliers of the Légion d'honneur
David di Donatello winners
Directors Guild of America Award winners
Film directors from Los Angeles
Film festival founders
Kennedy Center honorees
American LGBT rights activists
Living people
Male actors from California
Male actors from Santa Monica, California
Male Western (genre) film actors
New Star of the Year (Actor) Golden Globe winners
Pratt Institute alumni
Presidential Medal of Freedom recipients
United States National Medal of Arts recipients
University of Colorado Boulder alumni
Van Nuys High School alumni
Warner Bros. contract players